The 1991 South Pacific Games, held from 7–21 September 1991 at Port Moresby and Lae in Papua New Guinea, was the ninth edition of the South Pacific Games. This was the first time that events at one games had been held in two cities. The decision to do so was to allow both locations to benefit from the construction of new facilities.

Host nation Papua New Guinea topped the medal table for the first time at a South Pacific Games with a total of 100 medals won.

Participating countries
Sixteen Pacific nations participated in the Games:

Sports
17 sports were contested at the 1991 South Pacific Games:

Note: A number in parentheses indicates how many medal events were contested in that sport (where known).

Final medal table
Medals were awarded in a total of 164 events:

See also
Athletics at the 1991 South Pacific Games
Football at the 1991 South Pacific Games

Notes
  More than 2,000 athletes took part in the 1991 Games, which had more athletes and competitions than Auckland's 1990 Commonwealth Games.

 Western Samoa initially took the men's basketball gold medal but the team was disqualified after a citizenship controversy, in which players were deemed ineligible.

 Squash: There were individual and team events for men and women. PNG won all four gold medals. The South Pacific Games Council had announced in 1978 that squash would be included in the Games, and it was played in 1979, 1983, 1987, and 1991.

 Swimming: French Polynesia's 14-year-old star Daine Lacombe won five gold medals in the pool.

References

Sources

Pacific Games by year
Pacific Games
P
 
1991 in Papua New Guinean sport
International sports competitions hosted by Papua New Guinea
September 1991 sports events in Oceania